Theognis of Nicaea was a 4th-century Bishop of Nicaea, excommunicated after the First Council of Nicaea for not denouncing Arius and his nontrinitarianism strongly enough.

He is best known to history as an attendee present at the Council of Nicaea in 325. He was one of the Arian Bishops at that Council. He eventually signed the Nicean Creed with the other Arian supporters, Zopyrus (Bishop of Barca), Eusebius of Nicomedia and Maris of Chalcedon. He was exiled with the other three Arian bishops.

References

4th-century bishops in Roman Anatolia
Arian bishops
Bishops of Nicaea
People excommunicated by Christian churches
Year of birth unknown